The BET Awards is an American award show that was established in 2001 by the Black Entertainment Television network to celebrate black entertainers and other minorities in music, film, sports and philanthropy. The awards, which are presented annually, are broadcast live on BET. The annual presentation ceremony features performances by artists; some of the awards of more popular interest are presented in a televised ceremony.

Trophy
The Award Trophy, inspired by three words - aspire, ascend, achieve, was designed by artist/sculptor Carlos "Mare139" Rodriguez. Outkast won the first award trophy during the first ceremony in 2001. In 2007, Society Awards, the New York firm who manufactures the award, enhanced the quality of the trophy design using plated steel and black crystal.

List of ceremonies
The inaugural ceremony in 2001 was held at the Paris Las Vegas resort on the Las Vegas Strip. From 2002 to 2005, the Kodak Theatre in Hollywood hosted the awards. From 2006 to 2012, the ceremonies were held at the Shrine Auditorium in Los Angeles. The ceremony was moved to the Microsoft Theater at L.A. Live in 2013.

Ratings

Nomination process
The nomination process is handled by a voting academy made up of about 500 people from the music industry, involving the media, and bloggers. BET sends out ballots electronically and voters nominate deserving works and artists in all categories who they think should be nominated. Nominations and voting ballots are collated by Yangaroo, Inc., a leading digital distribution firm that works on many other televised award ceremonies, including those of BET's sister networks under parent company Paramount Global. The top nominees are determined in each category, and the winners are selected via the academy members' voting process.

Award categories

Current awards

Music
Album of the Year 
Video of the Year 
Coca-Cola Viewer's Choice Award 
Best Collaboration 
Best Female Hip-Hop Artist 
Best Male Hip-Hop Artist 
Best Female R&B/Pop Artist 
Best Male R&B Artist 
Artist of the Year 
Best New Artist 
Dr. Bobby Jones Best Gospel/Inspirational Award 

Movie
Best Movie 
Best Actress 
Best Actor 
Athlete
Sportswoman of the Year 
Sportsman of the Year 
Miscellaneous
Video Director of the Year 
Best International Act 
YoungStars Award 
Her Award 
Best New International Act

Defunct awards
Best Actor & Actress of the Year
Best Gospel Artist 
J Cool Like That Award 
J Award 
Centric Award 
Best International Act: Africa 
Best International Act: UK 
FANdemonium Award 
International Viewers' Choice Award 
Best International Act: Europe

Special awards
The BET Lifetime Achievement, Humanitarian and Ultimate Icon Award recipients, along with the nominees for other categories are announced in a press conference. At the awards ceremony a mini-documentary is shown covering the honorees' life. The awards are given out separately. The Ultimate Icon Award was created in 2015 and presented in the ceremony.

Lifetime Achievement
The BET Lifetime Achievement Award is given a veteran artist or group who has made notable contributions to the music industry. The honoree is paid tribute to by current popular singers who perform the honoree's most recognized songs. The honoree will usually perform themselves after being paid tribute.
2001: Whitney Houston
2002: Earth Wind & Fire
2003: James Brown
2004: The Isley Brothers
2005: Gladys Knight
2006: Chaka Khan
2007: Diana Ross
2008: Al Green
2009: The O'Jays
2010: Prince
2011: Patti LaBelle
2012: Maze Featuring Frankie Beverly
2013: Charlie Wilson
2014: Lionel Richie
2015: Smokey Robinson
2016: Samuel L. Jackson
2017: New Edition
2018: Anita Baker
2019: Mary J. Blige
2021: Queen Latifah
2022: Sean Combs
Humanitarian
In 2002, at the second annual BET Awards, the category for the BET Award Humanitarian Award was created. The Humanitarian Award is given to a celebrity philanthropist who donates their time and money to a charitable cause.
2002: Muhammad Ali
2003: Earvin "Magic" Johnson
2004: Danny Glover
2005: Denzel Washington and Pauletta Washington
2006: Harry Belafonte
2007: Don Cheadle
2008: Quincy Jones
2009: Alicia Keys and Wyclef Jean
2010: John Legend
2011: Steve Harvey
2012: Rev. Al Sharpton
2013: Dwyane Wade
2014: Myrlie Evers-Williams
2015: Tom Joyner
2016: Jesse Williams
2017: Chance the Rapper
2018: Naomi Wadler, Mamoudou Gassama, Justin Blackman, Shaun King, Anthony Borges and James Shaw Jr.
2019: Nipsey Hussle
2020: Beyoncé

Ultimate Icon
In 2015 and 2018, at the fifteenth and eighteenth annual BET Awards, the category of the Ultimate Icon Award was created. It is given to a veteran artist whose career is deemed iconic by fans and critics alike for their notable contributions in the music, dance and music video fields.
2015: Janet Jackson
2018: Debra L. Lee
2019: Tyler Perry

Most nominated and winning artists
Below are the current rankings for the most wins and most nominated artist (male & female):

Most wins (as of 2021)

Most nominations (as of 2017)
This is a list of multiple nominated performers, athletes & actors with 5 or more career nominations. Beyoncé is currently the most nominated performer with 75 nominations, solo and with Destiny's Child.

76 nominations
Beyoncé 68 solo; 8 w/ Destiny's Child

52 nominations
Chris Brown

51 nominations
Drake 46 solo; 5 w/ Young Money

35 nominations
Jay Z 30 solo; 5 w/ Watch The Throne
Nicki Minaj 31 solo; 4w/ Young Money

33 nominations
Lil Wayne 28 solo; 5 w/ Young Money

31 nominations
Kanye West 26 solo; 5 w/ Watch The Throne

23 nominations
Rihanna

21 nominations
Kendrick Lamar

19 nominations
Usher

18 nominations
Missy Elliott

17 nominations
Serena Williams

16 nominations
Bruno Mars
Venus Williams

15 nominations
Alicia Keys
T.I.

14 nominations
Jamie Foxx
Ludacris
Mary J. Blige

13 nominations
Erica Campbell  2 solo; 11 w/ Mary Mary 

12 nominations
Common
Pharrell Williams 10 solo; 2 w/ N.E.R.D.

11 nominations
Big Boi 1 solo; 10 w/ Outkast
Ciara
LeBron James
Mary Mary
Snoop Dogg
The Weeknd

10 nominations
Kobe Bryant
T-Pain
Outkast
Trina
Trey Songz
Tyga 6 solo; 4 w/ Young Money

9 nominations
Denzel Washington
Kelly Rowland 1 solo; 8 w/ Destiny's Child
Michelle Williams 1 solo; 8 w/ Destiny's Child
Taraji P. Henson

8 nominations
2 Chainz
50 Cent
Angela Bassett
ASAP Rocky 6 solo; 2 w/ ASAP Mob
Benny Boom
Big Sean
Busta Rhymes
Chloe x Halle
Destiny's Child
Diddy 5 solo; 3 w/ Diddy-Dirty Money
Hype Williams
Idris Elba
John Legend
Marsha Ambrosius 4 solo; 4 w/ Floetry
Miguel
Omarion 2 solo; 6 w/ B2K
Justin Timberlake
Rick Ross

7 nominations
Don Cheadle
Erykah Badu
Halle Berry
Jennifer Hudson
Keyshia Cole
Kirk Franklin
Mariah Carey
Ne-Yo
R. Kelly

6 nominations
Aaliyah
Anthony Hamilton
August Alsina
B.o.B
B2K
Benny Boom
CeeLo Green 2 solo; 4 w/ Gnarls Barkley
Keri Hilson
Lil Jon 3 solo; 3 w/ Lil' Jon and the Eastside Boyz
Lil' Kim
Musiq Soulchild
Samuel L. Jackson
Wale
Yolanda Adams

5 nominations
Bow Wow
Carmelo Anthony
Donnie McClurkin
Eminem
Eve
Fantasia
Gabrielle Union
Jill Scott
Keke Palmer
Melanie Fiona
Mindless Behavior
Nelly
Pusha T 3 solo; 2 w/ The Clipse
Regina King
Solange Knowles
Willow Smith

See also
BET Hip Hop Awards

References

External links
 BET Awards website

 
American music awards
American television awards
Awards established in 2001
Awards
Lifetime achievement awards
African-American events
Awards honoring African Americans
2001 establishments in the United States